"The Man From Ironbark" is a poem by Australian bush poet Banjo Paterson (Andrew Barton Paterson). It is written in the iambic heptameter.

It was first published in The Bulletin on 17 December 1892.  The poem relates the experiences of a man from the Bush who visits Sydney and becomes the subject of a practical joke by a mischievous barber. The barber pretends to cut the bushman's throat by slashing his newly-shaven neck using the back of his cut-throat razor that had been heated in boiling water. While making his displeasure known, 
A peeler man [i.e. policeman] who heard the din came in to see the show;
He tried to run the bushman in, but he refused to go.
The barber confesses that he was playing a joke, and the bushman, unconvinced, returns to Ironbark, where, due to his accounts of his Sydney experiences, "flowing beards are all the go".

There are obvious echoes in the poem of the urban legend of the murdering barber - fictionalised in the penny dreadful The String of Pearls which featured the notorious Sweeney Todd.

Ironbark was the earlier name for Stuart Town, a town in the Central West region of New South Wales.

In 2004, a representative of The Wilderness Society posed as "The Ghost of the Man from Ironbark", a reference to the poem, to campaign for the protection of the remaining Ironbark woodlands in New South Wales and Queensland.

External link

"The Man from Ironbark" – full text of the book The Man from Snowy River and Other Verses (including the poem "The Man from Ironbark") on Project Gutenberg Australia

References

1892 poems
Poetry by Banjo Paterson
Works originally published in The Bulletin (Australian periodical)